State leaders in the 8th century BC – State leaders in the 6th century BC – State leaders by year

This is a list of state leaders in the 7th century BC (700–601 BC).

Africa: North 
Cyrene

Cyrene (complete list) –
Battus I, King (630–600 BC)

Egypt's Third Intermediate Period and Kush

Kush: Twenty-fifth Dynasty of the Third Intermediate Period (complete list) –
Shebitku, Pharaoh (707/706–690 BC)
Taharqa, Pharaoh (690–664 BC)
Tantamani, Pharaoh (664–653 BC)

Kingdom of Kush (complete list) –
Atlanersa, King (653–640 BC)
Senkamanisken, King (640–620 BC)
Anlamani, King (620–600 BC)

Egypt: Late Period

Twenty-sixth Dynasty of the Late Period (complete list) –
Psamtik I, Pharaoh (664–610 BC)
Necho II, Pharaoh (610–595 BC)

Asia

Asia: East

China: Spring and Autumn period

Zhou, China: Eastern Zhou (complete list) –
Huan, King (719–697 BC)
Zhuang, King (696–682 BC)
Xi, King (681–677 BC)
Hui, King (676–652 BC)
Xiang, King (651–619 BC)
Qing, King (618–613 BC)
Kuang, King (612–607 BC)
Ding, King (606–586 BC)

Cai (complete list) –
Huan, Marquis (714–695 BC)
Ai, Marquis (694–675 BC)
Mu, Marquis (674–646 BC)
Zhuang, Marquis (645–612 BC)
Wen, Marquis (611–592 BC)

Cao (complete list) –
Zhuang, Duke (701–671 BC)
Li, Duke (670–662 BC)
Zhao, Duke (661–653 BC)
Gong, Duke (652–618 BC)
Wen, Duke (617–595 BC)

Chen (complete list) –
Li, Duke (706–700 BC BC)
Zhuang, Duke (699–693 BC BC)
Xuan, Duke (692–648 BC BC)
Mu, Duke (647–632 BC BC)
Gong, Duke (631–614 BC BC)
Ling, Duke (7th century BC)
Xia Zhengshu, ruler (7th–6th century BC)

Chu (complete list) –
Wu, King (740–690 BC)
Wen, King (689–677 BC)
Du'ao, ruler (676–672 BC)
Cheng, King (671–626 BC)
Mu, King (625–614 BC)
Zhuang, King (613–591 BC)

Jin (complete list) –
Min, Marquis (704–678 BC)
Huan Shu of Quwo, ruler (745–732 BC)
Zhuang Bo of Quwo, ruler (731–716 BC)
Wu, Duke of Quwo (715–679 BC), of Jin (678–677 BC)
Xian, Duke (676–651 BC)
Xiqi, ruler (651 BC)
Zhuozi, ruler (651 BC)
Hui, Duke (650–637 BC)
Huai, Duke (637 BC)
Wen, Duke (636–628 BC)
Xiang, Duke (627–621 BC)
Ling, Duke (620–607 BC)
Cheng, Duke (606–600 BC)

Lu (complete list) –
Huan, Duke (711–694 BC)
Zhuang, Duke (693–662 BC)
Ziban, ruler (662 BC)
Min, Duke (661–660 BC)
Xi, Duke (659–627 BC)
Wen I, Duke (626–609 BC)
Xuan, Duke (608–591 BC)

Qi: House of Jiang (complete list) –
Xi, Duke (730–698 BC)
Xiang, Duke (697–686 BC)
Wuzhi, ruler (686 BC)
Huan, Duke (685–643 BC)
Wukui, ruler (643 BC)
Xiao, Duke (642–633 BC)
Zhao, Duke (632–613 BC)
She, ruler (613 BC)
Yì, Duke (612–609 BC)
Hui, Duke (608–599 BC)

Qin (complete list) –
Chuzi I, Duke (703–698 BC)
Wu, Duke (697–678 BC)
De, Duke (677–676 BC)
Xuan, Duke (675–664 BC)
Cheng, Duke (663–660 BC)
Mu, Duke (659–621 BC)
Kang, Duke (620–609 BC)
Gong, Duke (608–604 BC)
Huan, Duke (603–577 BC)

Song (complete list) –
Zhuang, Duke (710–692 BC)
Min, Duke (691–682 BC)
You,, Duke (3 months)
Huan, Duke (681–651 BC)
Xiang, Duke (650–637 BC)
Cheng, Duke (636–620 BC)
Yu, Duke (a month)
Zhao, Duke (619–611 BC)
Wen, Duke (610–589 BC)

Wey (complete list) –
Xuan, Duke (718–700 BC)
Hui, Duke (699–669 BC)
Yi, Duke (668–661 BC)
Dai, Duke (660 BC)
Wen, Duke (659–635 BC)
Cheng, Duke (634–600 BC)

Yue (complete list) –
Wuren of Yue, Marquis (7th–6th century BC)

Zheng (complete list) –
Zhao, Duke (701 BC, 696–695 BC)
Li, Duke (700–697 BC, 679–673 BC)
Ziwei, Prince (694 BC)
Zheng Ziying, ruler (693–680 BC)
Wen, Duke (672–628 BC)
Mu, Duke (627–606 BC)
Ling, Duke (605 BC)
Xiang, Duke (604–587 BC)

Asia: Southeast
Vietnam
Hồng Bàng dynasty (complete list) –
Canh line, King (c.754–c.661 BC)
Tân line, King (c.660–c.569 BC)

Asia: South

Magadha of India, Brihadratha dynasty —
Janaka, King (702–681 BC)
Nandivardhdhana, King (681–661 BC)

Pradyota dynasty 
Varttivarddhana

Shakya Dynasty
Sinahana

Asia: West

Elam: Humban-Tahrid dynasty (complete list) –
Shutur-Nahhunte II, King (717–699 BC)
Hallushu-Inshushinak, King (699–693 BC)
Kutir-Nahhunte III, King (693–692 BC)
Humban-Numena III, King (692–688 BC)
Humban-Haltash I, King (688–681 BC)
Humban-Haltash II, King (681–675 BC)
Urtak-Inshushinak, King (675–663 BC)
Temti-Humban-Inshushinak I, King (663–653 BC)
Humban-Nikash II, King (653–651 BC)
Tammaritu, King (652–649 BC)
Indabibi, King (649 BC–?)
Humban-Haltash III, King (post-648–645/4 BC)
Tammaritu, King (647–647 BC)
Humban-Nikash III, King (647–647 BC)
Umhuluma, King (647–647 BC)
Indattu-Inshushinak IV, King (647 BC–?)
Humban-Hapua, King (647 BC)
Pa'e, King (646–post-645/4 BC)
Shutur-Nahhunte III, King (646 BC–?)
Humban-Kitin, King (last quarter of 7th century BC)
Humban-Tahrah II, King (7th/6th century)
Hallutash-Inshushinak, King (7th/6th century)

Tyre, Phoenecia — 
Elulaios, King (729–694 BC)
Abd Melqart, King (694–680 BC)
Baal I, King (680–660 BC)

Kingdom of Judah —
Chronologies as established by Albright
Hezekiah, King (715–687 BC)
Manasseh, King (687–642 BC)
Amon, King (642–640 BC)
Josiah, King (640–609 BC)
Jehoahaz, King (Reigned for 3 months, 609 BC)
Jehoiakim, King (609–598 BC)

Assyria: Neo-Assyrian Period
Sennacherib (705–681 BC)
Esarhaddon (681–669 BC)
Ashurbanipal (669–631/627 BC)
Ashur-etil-ilani, (c.631–627 BC)
Sin-shumu-lishir (626 BC)
Sin-shar-ishkun, (c.627–612 BC)
Ashur-uballit II (612 BC–c.609 BC)

Dynasty IX of Babylon 
Bel-ibni (703–700 BC)
Ashur-nadin-shumi (700–694 BC)
Nergal-ushezib (694–693 BC)
Mushezib-Marduk (693–689 BC)
Sin-ahhe-eriba (Sennacherib) (689–681 BC)
Ashur-ahha-iddina (Esarhaddon) (681–669 BC)
Shamash-shum-ukin (668–648 BC)
Kandalanu (648–627 BC)
Sin-shumu-lishir (626 BC)
Sinsharishkun, (c.627–620 BC)

Neo-Babylonian Empire: Dynasty XI (complete list) –
Nabopolassar, King (c.626–605 BC)
Nebuchadnezzar II, King (c.605–562 BC)

Lydia (complete list) –
Candaules, aka Myrsilus, King (died c.687 BC)
Gyges, King (c.687–c.652 BC)
Ardys, King (c.652–c.603 BC)
Sadyattes, King (c.603–c.591 BC)

Median Empire (complete list) –
Deioces, King (694–665 BC)
Phraortes, King (665–633 BC)
Cyaxares, King (625–585 BC)

Anshan (complete list) –
Teispes, King (c.655–640 BC)
Cyrus I, King (640–580 BC)

Urartu (complete list) –
Argishti II, King (714–680 BC)
Rusa II, King (680–639 BC)
Sarduri III, King (639–635 BC)
Erimena, King (635–629 BC)
Rusa III, King (629–590/615 BC)
Sarduri IV, King (615–595 BC)

Europe

Europe: Balkans

Athens (complete list) –

Apsander, Decennial Archon (703–693 BC)
Eryxias,  Decennial Archon (693–683 BC)
Creon, Archon (682–681 BC)
Lysiades, Archon (681–680 BC)
Tlesias, Archon (680–679 BC)

Leostratus, Archon (671–670 BC)
Pisistratus, Archon (669–668 BC)
Autosthenes, Archon (668–667 BC)
Miltiades, Archon (664–663 BC)
Miltiades, Archon (659–658 BC)
Dropides, Archon (645–644 BC)

Damasias, Archon (639–638 BC)
Epaenetus (?), Archon (634–633 BC)
Megacles, Archon (632–631 BC)
Aristaechmus, Archon (624–623 BC)
Heniochides, Archon (615–614 BC)
Aristocles, Archon (605–604 BC)

Corinth –
Cypselus, Tyrant (c.667–c.627 BC)
Periander, Tyrant (c.627–c.587 BC)

Macedonia: Argead dynasty (complete list) –
Perdiccas I, King (700–678 BC)
Argaeus I, King (678–640 BC)
Philip I, King (640–602 BC)
Aeropus I, King (602–576 BC)

Sparta: Eurypontid dynasty (complete list) –
Theopompus, King (c.725–675 BC)
Anaxandridas I (c.675–645 BC)
Zeuxidamas (c.645–625 BC)
Anaxidamus (c.625–600 BC)
Archidamus I (c.600–575 BC)

Europe: South

Roman Kingdom (complete list) –
Tullus Hostilius, King (673–642 BC)
Ancus Marcius, King (642–617 BC)
Lucius Tarquinius Priscus, King (616–579 BC)

References

State Leaders
-
7th-century BC rulers